Turboatom is a station on Kharkiv Metro's Kholodnohirsko–Zavodska Line. It was opened in 1975 as one of the first seven metro stations in Kharkiv. The station was the southern terminus of the line before 1978. It is located under the Moskovskyi Avenue. Until October 2019, the station was named "Moskovskyi Prospekt", on 16 October 2019, Kharkiv city council renamed the station to its current name. Mayor Hennadiy Kernes claimed it was renamed "to show respect for the staff" of the Turboatom enterprise.

References

External links
 Turboatom on Official Kharkiv Metro site

Kharkiv Metro stations
Railway stations opened in 1975